The Lopushna oil field is a Ukrainian oil field that was discovered in 1983. It began production in 1983 and produces oil.

References

Oil fields in Ukraine
Oil fields of the Soviet Union